Andy Kanavan (born 23 May 1961) is an English classical musician and multi-instrumentalist. He was best known for his work with post-punk bands Level 9, Foreign Playground and German band Styffe. Kanavan also played briefly with Killing Joke, Enigma, The Maisonettes and Dire Straits. He was recognized as a very capable drummer, as showcased in concerts such as Larks in the Park. He was also a founding member of Mellow Yellow.

A session musician, Kanavan drummed for Decca, Polydor and indie label Sabre, and became the drummer for the band Dream Cast on their ill-fated European tour, in which Dave Elliott (guitar), Chris Nichols (keyboards) and Helen Raven (vocals) died in a horrific traffic accident.

Born in Accrington, the former Royal Marine Officer built a reputation for his aggressive and rhythmic style of drumming. As a rock and soul drummer for bands both in Europe and the UK, Kanavan was never short of work. Following his brief spell of notoriety, Kanavan stepped away from the limelight in the early 1980s and began a new life as a music tutor in the South of England.

Following the death of his wife on 11 August 1989, Blue Haze vocalist Barbara Mac, he lost his love of music. He would fail to show at concerts and was soon dropped by mainstream record labels and bands.

Band history

Foreign Playground was founded by Kanavan and Hamilton and although found moderate success with the single "Would You" in Japan, the song failed to enter the UK chart. Panned by critics, the band released "Love in the Woods" which saw the band's popularity rise in Germany and Italy. In 1989, following the death of his wife, Kanavan had all but turned his back on the music industry. His clashes with other band members sealed the fate of the band. In 1983, the band parted company.

References

External links

David Roberts (2006). British Hit Singles & Albums (19th ed.). HIT Entertainment. 

English multi-instrumentalists
English session musicians
British male drummers
Living people
1961 births
People from Accrington